Economic zones, or macrozones, group economic regions of Russia into territories that share common economic trends.  Economic regions or their parts may belong to more than one economic zone.

List and composition of economic zones and macrozones
Baikal Amur Mainline economic zone (ekonomicheskaya zona Baykalo-Amurskoy magistrali)
Amur Oblast (partially)
Mazanovsky District
Selemdzhinsky District
town of Tynda
Tyndinsky District
town of Zeya
Zeysky District
Buryat Republic (partially)
Bauntovsky District
Severo-Baykalsky District
town of Severobaykalsk
Chita Oblast (partially)
Kalarsky District
Irkutsk Oblast (partially)
town of Bodaybo
Bodaybinsky District
Kazachinsko-Lensky District
Kirensky District
Mamsko-Chuysky District
town of Ust-Kut
Zhigalovsky District
Khabarovsk Krai (partially)
town of Amursk
city of Komsomolsk-on-Amur
Komsomolsky District
Solnechny District
Sovetsko-Gavansky District
Vaninsky District
Verkhnebureinsky District
Sakha Republic (partially)
Aldansky Ulus
settlement of Berkakit
settlement of Chulman
settlement of Khani
settlement of Nagorny
town of Neryungri
Olyokminsky Ulus
settlement of Serebryany Bor
settlement of Zolotinka
Central-Northern economic zone (Tsentralno-Severnaya ekonomicheskaya zona)
Central economic region
Kaliningrad Oblast
Northern economic region
Northwestern economic region
Volga-Vyatka economic region
East Russia economic zone (Vostochno-Rossiyskaya ekonomicheskaya zona)
East Siberian economic region
Far Eastern economic region
Urals economic region
West Siberian economic region
European Russia economic zone (ekonomicheskaya zona Yevropeyskoy Rossii)
Central economic region
Central-Chernozemic economic region
Kaliningrad Oblast
North Caucasus economic region
Northern economic region
Northwestern economic region
Povolzhye economic region
Volga-Vyatka economic region
European Russia and Urals economic macrozone (ekonomicheskaya makrozona Yevropeyskoy Rossii i Urala)
Central economic region
Central-Chernozemic economic region
Kaliningrad Oblast
North Caucasus economic region
Northern economic region
Northwestern economic region
Povolzhye economic region
Urals economic region
Volga-Vyatka economic region
Non-Chernozemic economic zone (Nechernozyomnaya ekonomicheskaya zona)
Central economic region
Kaliningrad Oblast
Northern economic region
Northwestern economic region
Perm Krai
Sverdlovsk Oblast
Udmurt Republic
Volga-Vyatka economic region
Siberian economic zone (Sibirskaya ekonomicheskaya zona)
East Siberian economic region
West Siberian economic region
South Russia economic zone (Yuzhno-Rossiyskaya ekonomicheskaya zona)
Central-Chernozemic economic region
North Caucasus economic region
Trans-Ural economic macrozone (ekonomicheskaya makrozona Zauralskoy Rossii)
East Siberian economic region
Far Eastern economic region
West Siberian economic region
Volga-Urals economic zone (Volgo-Uralskaya ekonomicheskaya zona)
Povolzhye economic region
Urals economic region

See also
Economic regions of Russia

References

Political divisions of Russia